The 21st (twenty-first) century is the current century in the Anno Domini era or Common Era, under the Gregorian calendar. It began on 1 January 2001 (MMI) and will end on 31 December 2100 (MMC).

The rise of a global economy and Third World consumerism marked the beginning of the century, along with increased private enterprise and deepening global concern over terrorism after the 9/11 terrorist attacks. The NATO interventions in Afghanistan and Iraq in the early 2000s, and the overthrow of several regimes during the Arab Spring in the early 2010s, led to mixed outcomes in the Arab world, resulting in several civil wars and political instability. The United States has remained the global superpower, while China is now considered an emerging superpower.

In 2017, 49.3% of the world's population lived in "some form of democracy", though only 4.5% lived in "full democracies". The United Nations estimates that by 2050, two thirds of the world's population will be urbanized.

The European Union was greatly expanded in the 21st century, adding 13 member states, but the United Kingdom withdrew. Most European Union member states introduced a common currency, the Euro. The North Atlantic Treaty Organization (NATO) was also greatly expanded, adding 11 member states.

The world economy expanded at high rates from $42.29 trillion in 2000 to $94.10 trillion in 2021, although many economies rose at greater levels, and some gradually contracted.

Effects of global warming and rising sea levels exacerbated the ecological crises, with eight islands disappearing between 2007 and 2014.

In early 2020, the COVID-19 pandemic began to rapidly spread worldwide, killing over 6.8 million people around the globe and causing severe global economic disruption, including the largest global recession since the Great Depression.

Due to the sudden proliferation of internet-accessible mobile devices, such as smartphones becoming ubiquitous worldwide beginning in the early 2010s, more than half of the world's population obtained access to the Internet by 2018. After the success of the Human Genome Project, DNA sequencing services became available and affordable.

Pronunciation
There is a lack of general agreement over how to pronounce specific years of the 21st century in English. Academics have pointed out that the early years of previous centuries were commonly pronounced as, for example, "eighteen oh five" (for 1805) and "nineteen oh five" (for 1905). Generally, the early years of the 21st century were pronounced as in "two-thousand (and) five", with a change taking place around 2010, when pronunciations often shifted between the early-years form of "two-thousand and ten" and the traditionally more concise form of "twenty-ten".

The Vancouver Olympics, which took place in 2010, was being officially referred to by Vancouver 2010 as "the twenty-ten Olympics".

Society

Advances in technology such as ultrasound, prenatal genetic testing and genetic engineering are changing the demographics and has the potential to change the genetic makeup of the human population. Because of sex-selective abortion, fewer girls have been born in the 21st century (and since the early 1980s) compared to past centuries, mostly because of son preference in East and South Asia. In 2014, only 47 percent of Indian births were of girls. This has led to an increase in bachelors in countries such as China and India. The first genetically modified children were born in November 2018 in China, beginning a new biological era for the human species and raising great controversy.

Anxiety and depression rates have risen in the United States and many other parts of the world. However, suicide rates have fallen in Europe and most of the rest of the world so far this century, declining 29% globally between 2000 and 2018, despite rising 18% in the United States in the same period. The decline in suicide has been most notable among Chinese and Indian women, the elderly, and middle-aged Russian men.

Knowledge and information
The entire written works of humanity, from the beginning of recorded history to 2003, in all known languages, are estimated to be at five exabytes of data. Since 2003, with the beginning of social media and "user-generated content", the same amount of data is created every two days. The growth of human knowledge and information continues at an exponential rate.

Telecommunications in the early 21st century are much more advanced and universal than they were in the late 20th century. Only a few percent of the world's population were Internet users and cellular phone owners in the late 1990s; as of 2018, 55% of the world's population is online, and as of 2019, an estimated 67% own a cell phone. In the 2010s, artificial intelligence, mainly in the form of deep learning and machine learning, became more prevalent and is prominently used in Gmail and Google's search engine, in banking, with the military and other areas. In 2017, 14% of the world's population still lacked access to electricity.

In 2001, Dennis Tito became the first space tourist, beginning the era of commercial spaceflight. Entrepreneurs Elon Musk and Richard Branson are working towards commercial space exploration, colonization and tourism, while China and India have made substantial strides in their space programs. On 3 January 2019, China landed a robotic spacecraft on the far side of the Moon, the first to do so.

Culture and politics

War and violence have declined considerably compared to the 20th century, continuing the post-World War II trend called Long Peace. Malnourishment and poverty are still widespread globally, but fewer people live in the most extreme forms of poverty. In 1990, approximately one-in-four people were malnourished, and nearly 36% of the world's population lived in extreme poverty; by 2015, these numbers had dropped to approximately one-in-eight and 10%, respectively.

The Facebook–Cambridge Analytica data scandal drew international attention to the possible adverse effects of social media in influencing citizen's views, particularly regarding the 2016 United States presidential election.

Population and urbanization
The world population was about 6.1 billion at the start of the 21st century and reached 8 billion by November 2022. It is estimated to reach nearly 8.6 billion by 2030, and 9.8 billion by 2050. According to the United Nations World Urbanization prospects, a 60% projection of the world's human population is to live in megacities and megalopolises by 2030, 70% by 2050, and 90% by 2080. It is expected by 2040, the investing of more than 5 times the current global gross domestic product is expected to be in urban infrastructure.

Life expectancy has increased as child mortality continues to decline. A baby born in 2016, for example, will, on average (globally), live to 72 years—26 years longer than the global average of someone born in 1950. Ten million Britons (16% of the United Kingdom population) will, on average, live to 100 or older.

Climate change remains a serious concern; UN Chief António Guterres, for instance, has described it as an "existential threat" to humanity. Furthermore, the Holocene extinction event, the sixth most significant extinction event in the Earth's history, continues with the widespread degradation of highly biodiverse habitats as a by-product of human activity.

Economics, education and retirement
Economically and politically, the United States and Western Europe were dominant at the beginning of the century; by the 2010s, China became an emerging global superpower and, by some measures, the world's largest economy. In terms of purchasing power parity, India's economy became more significant than Japan's around 2011.

Bitcoin and other cryptocurrencies are decentralized currencies that are not controlled by any central bank. These currencies are increasing in popularity worldwide due to the expanding availability of the internet and are mainly used as a store of value.

There is an ongoing impact of technological unemployment due to automation and computerization: the rate at which jobs are disappearing—due to machines replacing them—is expected to escalate. Automation alters the number of jobs and the skills demands of industries. As of 2019, the production output of first world nations' manufacturing sectors was doubled when compared to 1984 output; but it is now produced with one-third fewer workers and at significantly reduced operating costs. Half of all jobs with requirements lower than a bachelor's degree are currently in the process of being replaced with partial- or full-automation.

The World Economic Forum forecast that 65% of children entering primary school will end up in jobs or careers that currently do not yet exist.

A rise in the retirement age has been called for in view of an increase in life expectancy and has been put in place in many jurisdictions.

Linguistic diversity
As of 2009, Ethnologue catalogued 6,909 living human languages. The exact number of known living languages will vary from 5,000 to 10,000, generally depending on the precision of one's definition of "language", and in particular, on how one classifies dialects.

Estimates vary depending on many factors, but the general consensus is that there are between 6,000 and 7,000 languages currently spoken. Between 50 and 90% of those will have become extinct by the year 2100.

The top 20 languages spoken by more than 50 million speakers each, are spoken by 50% of the world's population. In contrast, many of the other languages are spoken by small communities, most of them with fewer than 10,000 speakers.

Events

2000s

1998–2003 – The Second Congo War continued into the early 21st century. A 1999 ceasefire quickly broke down and a UN peacekeeping mission, MONUC, was unable to control the fighting. Troops from Rwanda and Uganda continued to support rebel groups against the Democratic Republic of the Congo and rifts also grew between Rwanda and Uganda as they accused each other of supporting rival rebel groups as well. Laurent Kabila, president of the DRC, was assassinated in January 2001 and his son, Joseph Kabila, took power. Throughout 2002 steps were made towards peace and Rwanda and Uganda both removed their troops from the country. On December 17, 2002, a massive treaty officially ended the war. However, the DRC only holds power in less than half of the country, with most of the eastern and northern portions still controlled by rebel groups, where there is still significant infighting. In addition, Rwanda still supports anti-DRC rebels and anti-Rwandan rebels continue to operate from the DRC. The war killed an estimated 3.9 million people, displaced nearly 5.5 million, and led to a widespread and ongoing famine that continues to result in deaths. Severe human rights violations continue to be reported.
2000–2005 – The Second Intifada, a major Palestinian uprising against Israel, is estimated to have led to the deaths of approximately 3,000 Palestinians and 1,000 Israelis.
2001
January 20: 
George W. Bush is inaugurated as the 43rd president of the United States. He is the second president from the Bush family, after his father.
Gloria Macapagal-Arroyo becomes the second woman President of the Philippines and the first to be the child of a previous President, Diosdado Macapagal.
April 1 – The Netherlands becomes the first country in the world to legalize same-sex marriage.
May 13 – Conservative media magnate Silvio Berlusconi wins the general election in Italy, becoming the country's Prime Minister. Berlusconi would go on to dominate Italian politics for the rest of the decade.
June 1 – The Nepalese royal massacre occurs at a house on the grounds of the Narayanhity Royal Palace, the residence of the Nepalese monarchy. Ten members of the family were killed during a party or monthly reunion dinner of the royal family in the house. The dead included King Birendra of Nepal and Queen Aishwarya.
July 20–22 – More than 200,000 anti-globalization protesters march in Genoa, during the 27th G8 summit. Two demonstrators are killed by the Italian police. On July 21, a group of Carabinieri attacked the school Armando Diaz, critically injuring many peaceful protesters. Prime Minister Silvio Berlusconi insisted that police used the minimum amount of force necessary to achieve their goals.
September 11 – September 11 attacks – Nineteen al-Qaeda terrorists hijack four commercial airliners and crash two of them into the World Trade Center, one into the Pentagon and one into a field in Shanksville, Pennsylvania of the United States on 11 September, killing nearly 3,000 people. The president George W. Bush subsequently declares the War on Terror.
December 11 – After 15 years of negotiations, the People's Republic of China becomes a member of the World Trade Organization (WTO).
2001–2014 – The Northern Alliance and NATO-led ISAF invades Afghanistan on October 7, 2001, and overthrows the Al-Qaeda-supportive Taliban government. Troops remained to install a democratic government, fight a slowly escalating insurgency, and to hunt for Al-Qaeda leader Osama bin Laden who would be killed by American troops nearly 10 years later, on May 2, 2011. On December 24, 2014, NATO forces officially ended combat operations in Afghanistan, but forces remained until August 30, 2021, followed by a quick withdrawal of all troops.
2002
May 20 – After a long period of occupation by Indonesia, East Timor's independence is recognized by Portugal and the UN. 
July 1 – The International Criminal Court (ICC) is established.
September 10 – Switzerland, a neutral country, becomes a member of the United Nations.
October 12 – Jemaah Islamiyah, a violent Islamist group, claims responsibility for the detonation of three bombs in the tourist district of Kuta on the Indonesian island of Bali. The attack killed 202 people and left 209 people injured.
November 15 – Hu Jintao becomes the General Secretary of the Chinese Communist Party, making him the paramount leader of China after Jiang Zemin. 
2003–present – In February 2003, a conflict in Darfur, Sudan begins and escalates into full-scale war. By 2008 it was believed that up to 400,000 people had been killed and over 2.5 million displaced. In 2005, the ICC decided that Darfur war criminals would be tried, and on July 14, 2008, Sudanese president Omar al-Bashir was charged with 5 accounts of crimes against humanity and 2 accounts of war crimes, even though the ICC had no power to enforce such charges.
2003–2010 – The U.S.-led coalition invades Iraq on March 20, 2003, and overthrows the government of Saddam Hussein (who is executed by the Iraqi government on December 30, 2006). Coalition troops remain in the country to install a democratic government and fight an escalating insurgency. In addition to an insurgency against the American presence, Iraq also suffered from a civil war for several years. The war was soon seen as the central front of the War on Terror by many governments, despite growing international dissatisfaction with the war. The total death toll has been estimated at near 150,000 but these estimations are highly disputed, with one highly disputed study guessing even over 1 million. After the U.S.-led coalition initiated a troop surge in 2007, casualty numbers have decreased significantly. Combat ended, at least officially, in August 2010.
2003–2005 – A series of nonviolent revolutions known as the colour revolutions overthrow governments in Georgia, Ukraine, Kyrgyzstan, and Lebanon.
2003 
December – Libyan leader Muammar Gaddafi announces that Libya would voluntarily eliminate all weapons of mass destruction.
2004 
March 11 – Ten explosions occur at the Cercanías commuter train system of Madrid, Spain, killing 191 people and injuring around 2,000.
May 1 – The European Union expands by 10 countries (including 8 former communist countries, plus Malta and Cyprus).
May 10 – Gloria Macapagal-Arroyo is re-elected as President of the Philippines, marking the first time a woman was re-elected to the position in the country.
June 5 – Former U.S. president Ronald Reagan dies at the age of 93, after suffering nearly a decade from Alzheimer's disease.
September 1 – A group of Chechen rebels invades a school in Beslan, keeping thousands of hostages during three days. A series of shootings and bombings kills 334 people and injured 750.
November 11 – Palestinian leader and Chairman of the Palestine Liberation Organization Yasser Arafat dies in France, at the age of 75, from hemorrhagic stroke.
November 18 – Massachusetts becomes the first U.S. state to legalize same-sex marriage.
2005
April 19 – After the death of Pope John Paul II on April 2, Joseph Ratzinger of Germany is elected as Pope Benedict XVI.
July 7 – Four Islamic extremist suicide bombers set off three bombs in London; 56 people are killed, including the four suicide bombers.
November 22 – Angela Merkel becomes the first elected female Chancellor of Germany.
2006–2008 – The dismantling of former Yugoslavia continues after Montenegro gains independence on June 3, 2006, and Kosovo declares independence on February 17, 2008. Kosovo's independence is disputed by Russia and many of its allies and remains partially recognized to this day.
2006 
July 12 – Hezbollah crosses the border of Lebanon and captures two Israeli soldiers. Israel responds by sending troops across the border and bombing Hezbollah strongholds, while Hezbollah fires missiles on towns in northern Israel, approximately 6 each day. At the end of the war 1,200 Lebanese civilians, 500 Hezbollah fighteres, 44 Israeli civilians and 121 Israeli soldiers die. A ceasefire is signed on August 14, after which Israeli troops withdrew from Lebanon. 
October 9 – North Korea conducts its first nuclear test. This was preceded by years of political wrangling with the U.S. over the status of their nuclear program.
2007–2008 – Nepal's centuries-old monarchy is disestablished, and the country becomes a republic.
2007 
January 1 – Bulgaria and Romania join the European Union.
January 25 – A civil war escalates in the Gaza Strip throughout June, which would result in the Hamas driving most Fatah-loyal forces out from the Strip. In reaction, Palestinian president Mahmoud Abbas dismisses Hamas Prime Minister Ismail Haniyeh and dissolves the Hamas-ruled parliament. Scattered conflict continues.
July 25 – Pratibha Patil becomes the first woman to be elected President of India.
December 13 – 27 EU member states sign the Treaty of Lisbon, with the treaty coming into effect on December 1, 2009.
2007–2008 – Crisis follows the Kenyan presidential election of 2007, leading to the formation of a coalition government, with Mwai Kibaki as president and Raila Odinga as prime minister.
2008
February 16 – Kosovo unilaterally declares independence from Serbia. Serbia refuses to recognize it and considers Kosovo as part of its territory.
April 1 – Some cadres of the Communist Party of Nepal (Maoist Centre) attack Senior leader of Nepali Congress, Bal Chandra Poudel, during an electoral period in Rasuwa, Nepal.
August 1–12 – An armed conflict is fought between Georgia and the Russian Federation together with Ossetian and Abkhazian separatists on the other. Russia officially recognizes independence of Abkhazia and South Ossetia.
November 4 – Barack Obama is elected as the first African-American president of the United States. He is sworn into office in January 20, 2009. He is awarded the 2009 Nobel Peace Prize by the Norwegian Nobel Committee, which cited "his extraordinary efforts to strengthen international diplomacy and cooperation between peoples," and accepted the award the following year with "deep gratitude and great humility".
2009
June 13 – Protests erupt in Iran, following the presidential election against Iranian President Mahmoud Ahmadinejad.

2010s

2010
February 25 – Kamla Persad-Bissessar becomes the first female Prime Minister of Trinidad and Tobago.
April 10 – Polish President Lech Kaczyński dies in an airplane crash near the city of Smolensk, Russia, along with his wife and 94 other people on board.
May 10 – Benigno Simeon Aquino III is the first bachelor President of the Philippines and the second to be the child of a previous president.
June 11–July 11 – South Africa becomes the first country in Africa to host the FIFA World Cup.
June 24 – Julia Gillard becomes the first female Prime Minister of Australia.
October 3 – Dilma Rousseff is elected as the first female president of Brazil. She serves as the president until her impeachment and removal from office on August 31, 2016.
November 13 – Burmese opposition leader and 1991 Nobel Peace Prize laureate Aung San Suu Kyi is released from house arrest, after being incarcerated since 1989.
December 17 – The Arab Spring, a revolutionary wave, begins in Tunisia, and eventually spreads across the Middle East and the Arab world, with widespread protests, demonstrations, riots and civil wars for free elections and human rights.
2011 
March 11 – The 2011 Tōhoku earthquake and tsunami and subsequent Fukushima Daiichi nuclear disaster in Japan leave 15,899 dead.
April 29 – An estimated two billion people watch the wedding of Prince William, Duke of Cambridge and Catherine Middleton at Westminster Abbey in London.
May 2 – Al-Qaeda leader Osama bin Laden, the mastermind behind the 9/11 attacks, is killed in a raid at his compound in Abbottabad, Pakistan by the U.S. Navy's SEAL Team 6 (DEVGRU).
July 10 – Britain's largest tabloid newspaper, the News of the World, shuts down after 168 years in print due to the 2009 phone hacking scandal.
July 14 – South Sudan, following the January 2011 independence referendum, becomes a member of the United Nations.
July 22 – Anders Behring Breivik perpetrates two terrorist attacks in Norway, the first being a bombing targeting government buildings in central Oslo, the second being a mass shooting at a youth camp on the island of Utøya. It was the deadliest attack in Norway since the Second World War, with 77 people killed and 319 injuries.
September 17 – The Occupy movement, an international protest movement against social and economic inequality, takes shape. It is partially inspired by the Arab Spring and is one of the first significant global protest movements to occur in the age of social media.
October 20 – Deposed dictator Muammar Gaddafi is captured and killed by the National Liberation Army of Libya, during the Libyan Civil War.
November 16 – Italy's long-term Prime Minister Silvio Berlusconi resigns amid public protests, financial crisis and sexual scandals.
December 15 – The Iraq War is formally declared over.
December 17 – Kim Jong-il, supreme leader of North Korea, dies. He is succeeded by his son Kim Jong-un.
2012
January 12 – Civil unrest breaks out in Romania in January 2012, partially due to the introduction of a new health reform legislation, but also due to the unpopularity of Băsescu-backed Boc government. The unrest continues until Victor Ponta's resignation in November 2015, in the wake of the Colectiv nightclub fire.
September 11–12 – In Benghazi, Libya, an attack is coordinated against two United States government facilities, by members of the Islamic militant group Ansar al-Sharia.
November 15 – Xi Jinping becomes the General Secretary of the Chinese Communist Party, making him the paramount leader of China after Hu Jintao.
December 10 – Séléka rebels seize power in the Central African Republic, ousting the President and government and beginning a civil war.
December 14 – The Sandy Hook Elementary School shooting takes place, the deadliest mass shooting in an elementary school in US history, with 27 deaths.
December 19 – Park Geun-hye is elected President of South Korea, the first woman to hold the position.
2013
January 11 – France intervenes with its army in the Northern Mali conflict, defeating the Islamists who had taken control of the country.
February 28 – Pope Benedict XVI resigns, becoming the first pope to do so since 1415. Benedict takes the title pope emeritus. At the subsequent papal conclave, Cardinal Jorge Mario Bergoglio of Argentina is elected pope on March 13, becoming the first Latin American pope. Bergoglio takes the name of Pope Francis.
March 5 – President of Venezuela Hugo Chávez dies due to prostate cancer and is succeeded by Nicolás Maduro.
March 21 – Convicted Kurdish leader Abdullah Ocalan puts an end to the armed revolt against Turkey.
April 8 – British politician and first female Prime Minister of the UK Margaret Thatcher dies at the age of 87, from a stroke.
July 1 – Croatia becomes the 28th member of the European Union.
September 14 – Syria avoids an American intervention on its soil during the Syrian Civil War, accepting to destroy all chemical weapons stocks owned.
November – China declares an "Air Defense Identification Zone" in the East China Sea, including over the Senkaku Islands, a group of islands held by Japan, but claimed by both Japan and China, and the Socotra Rock, claimed by both China and South Korea.
December 5 – South African political and civil leader Nelson Mandela dies at the age of 95, from natural causes.
December 15 – The South Sudanese Civil War breaks out.
Iran allows international inspections on its nuclear policy in exchange of the removal of the sanctions and the right to produce a small amount of low-grade enriched uranium, thus marking an apparent new policy towards the United Nations under Hassan Rohani's presidency.
2013–2014 – A political crisis in Thailand breaks out and the government declares martial law.
2014
February 22 – Pro-Russian President of Ukraine Viktor Yanukovich is ousted amidst the Euromaidan revolution. The Russian Federation annexes Crimea in response, and a "low intensity" war in Donbas breaks out between the Ukrainian government and Russian-backed separatists. 
May 26 – Narendra Modi becomes 14th Prime Minister of India, winning a clear majority in the election.
July 8–August 26 – In Israel, tensions rise again between Hamas in the Gaza Strip and the State of Israel. Hamas fire hundreds of missiles into civilian cities in Israel, and the IDF retaliates and conducts airstrikes on the Gaza Strip for more than a month, with high casualties on both sides.
July 17 – Malaysia Airlines Flight 17, a civilian commercial aircraft, is shot down in pro-Russian separatist-controlled territory in Eastern Ukraine.
September 18 – Scotland votes to remain part of the United Kingdom during the 2014 Scottish independence referendum.
September–October – During the Syrian civil war, the Islamic State of Iraq and the Levant rises and seizes territories in northern Iraq and Syria, near the border with Turkey. The United States lead a coalition of more than 30 countries to destroy ISIL. Meanwhile, Russia leads its own coalition, along with Syria, Iraq and Iran, and Russia's military action begins on September 30, 2015.
October 31 – In Burkina Faso, President Blaise Compaoré resigns amidst widespread protests, ending 27 years of leadership.
November 16 – In Romania, Klaus Iohannis wins the November 2014 election, becoming the first Romanian president of an ethnic minority.
December 17 – United States President Barack Obama and Cuban President Raúl Castro announce the beginning of a process of normalizing relations between Cuba and the United States, ending a 54-year stretch of hostility between the two nations. Meanwhile, on July 20, 2015, with full diplomatic relations, the embassies of both countries are opened after five decades.
2015 
January 7 – Two gunmen, brothers Saïd and Chérif Kouachi, commit a mass murder at the offices of Charlie Hebdo in Paris, killing 12 people. Following the attack, about two million people, including more than 40 world leaders, met in Paris for a rally of national unity, and 3.7 million people joined demonstrations across the country. The phrase Je suis Charlie became a common slogan of support at the rallies and in social media.
March 23 – Singaporean politician and the 1st Prime Minister of Singapore Lee Kuan Yew dies at the age of 91.
June 26 – The Supreme Court of the United States determines that same-sex couples have a constitutional right to marry in a landmark case Obergefell v. Hodges.
July 14 – Iran and the P5+1 (China, France, Russia, the UK, and the US + Germany) agree on final provisions of Joint Comprehensive Plan of Action in regards to the latter's nuclear program.
October – The Chinese Communist Party announces the end of one-child policy after 35 years.
November 13 – ISIL claims responsibility of the November 2015 Paris attacks, which killed 137 and left 416 injured.
November 24 – Turkey shoots down a Russian Sukhoi Su-24M attack aircraft. This is the first case of a NATO member destroying a Russian aircraft since the attack on the Sui-ho Dam (during the Korean War).
November 30–December 12 – During the UN summit on Climate Change, 193 nations agree to reduce carbon emissions starting in 2020.
During the 2015 European migrant crisis, around 1.3 million people, most notably refugees of the wars in Syria, Iraq and Afghanistan, flee to Europe to claim asylum, leading to considerable political upheaval in the European Union. Germany ultimately takes in the majority of the asylum seekers.
2016
May 9 – Rodrigo Duterte becomes the first Mindanaoan President of the Philippines and the oldest person ever elected to the presidency.
June 5 – Hillary Clinton becomes the Democratic Party's nominee for president of the United States, making her the first woman to be nominated for president by a major party. 
June 12 – In Orlando, Florida, Omar Mateen, a 29-year-old security guard, kills 49 people and wounds 53 others in a terrorist attack inside Pulse, a gay nightclub.
June 23 – The United Kingdom votes to leave the European Union in the June 2016 membership referendum.
July 13 – After 6 years of leadership, British Prime Minister David Cameron resigns and is succeeded by Theresa May.
July 15–16 – A coup d'état is attempted in Turkey against state institutions, including but not limited to the government and President Recep Tayyip Erdoğan. The attempt is carried out by a faction within the Turkish Armed Forces that organized themselves as the Peace at Home Council.
September 2 – 1st President of Uzbekistan Islam Karimov dies at age of 78, after 25 years of leadership.
November 8 – Donald Trump is elected as the 45th president of the United States, defeating Hillary Clinton.
December 19:
Andrei Karlov, the Russian Ambassador to Turkey, is killed by Turkish police officer Mevlüt Mert Altıntaş.
The Islamic State of Iraq and the Levant claims responsibility for the 2016 Berlin truck attack in Germany, in which 12 were killed and 49 others injured.
Cuban political and revolutionary leader Fidel Castro dies at the age of 90.
Former President of Israel and 1994 Nobel Peace Prize laureate Shimon Peres dies at the age of 93, from a massive stroke.
Bhumibol Adulyadej, the longest-reigning Thai monarch dies at the age of 88, from a long illness.
2017 
January 21–22 – In opposition to Donald Trump's inauguration, millions of people in the US and worldwide join the Women's March.
January 27 – U.S. President Donald Trump signs an executive order restricting travel and immigration from seven Muslim-majority countries. This order was blocked by the U.S. federal courts; a second, related order issued by Trump was also blocked by the federal courts. The block of second order was partially removed, by the Supreme Court, in June. The Supreme Court stated they would reconsider the order in October.
April 6 – In response to a suspected chemical weapons attack on a rebel-held town, the U.S. military launches 59 Tomahawk cruise missiles at Shayrat Airbase in Syria.
May 23 – Philippine President Rodrigo Duterte declares martial law in Mindanao, following an attack in Marawi by the Maute group. This would last until October 23.
August 17–18 – In the 2017 Barcelona attacks, a terrorist drives into more than 100 people in Barcelona, Spain, killing 13 and injuring many.
October 27 – Catalonia declares independence from Spain, but the declaration is not recognized by the Spanish government or any other sovereign nation.
2018
March 19 – Paula-Mae Weekes becomes the first female President of Trinidad and Tobago on the 19th of March.
March 24 – In over 900 cities internationally, people participate in demonstrations against gun violence and mass shootings, calling for stronger gun control in the March for Our Lives, which was a student-led demonstration in response to the Stoneman Douglas High School shooting in Parkland, Florida that took place in February 14.
May 9 – The opposition-led Pakatan Harapan coalition, led by former Prime Minister Mahathir Mohamad, secures a parliamentary majority in the Malaysian Parliament, ending the 61-year rule of the Barisan Nasional coalition in Malaysia since independence in 1957.
May 19 – The wedding of Prince Harry and Meghan Markle is held at St George's Chapel, England, with an estimated global audience of 1.9 billion.
June 12 – President Donald Trump and North Korean leader Kim Jong-un attend a summit in Singapore, the first meeting between the leaders of the two countries.
October 28 – Jair Bolsonaro is elected as the 38th president of Brazil, after having been stabbed during the election campaign and undergone three surgeries.
The National People's Congress of China approves a constitutional change removing term limits for its leaders, granting Xi Jinping the status of "leader for life". Xi is the General Secretary of the Chinese Communist Party (de facto leader).
2019
January 10 – Venezuela enters a presidential crisis after the disputed results of the 2018 Venezuelan presidential election leads to Juan Guaidó being declared the acting president, disputing Nicolás Maduro.
February 27–28 – President Donald Trump and North Korean leader Kim Jong-un meet for the 2019 North Korea–United States Hanoi Summit in Vietnam.
March 13 – The Suzano school shooting: In a school in Suzano, São Paulo, Brazil, two ex-students kill 8 people and injure 11 others before committing suicide.
March 15: 
The Christchurch mosque shootings: Australian terrorist Brenton Harrison Tarrant kills 51 people and injures 40 at two mosques in New Zealand.
Over 2 million people in Hong Kong protest against proposed legislation regarding extradition to China.
March 23 – Most of the territory formerly held by the Islamic State in Syria collapses amidst the Syrian Civil War. After years of global push back, the extremist group transitions from a proto-state into an insurgency as it retains offshoots and influence in regions across the globe.
April 30 – Emperor Akihito of Japan abdicates from his throne, the first abdication by a Japanese monarch in almost two centuries. The abdication ends the Heisei era of Japan and ushers in the Reiwa era with new emperor Naruhito ascending to the throne on May 1.
July 16 – The European Parliament elects Ursula von der Leyen as the new president of the European Commission.
July 24 – Boris Johnson becomes Prime Minister of the United Kingdom after defeating Jeremy Hunt in a leadership contest, succeeding Theresa May.
December 10 – Sanna Marin, at the age of 34, becomes the world's youngest serving prime minister after being selected to lead Finland's Social Democratic Party.
December 18 – President Donald Trump is impeached by the United States House of Representatives.
December 31 – The first known case of COVID-19 is reported in Wuhan, China; the disease would rapidly proliferate into a global pandemic throughout the next three months.

2020s

2020
January 3 – A U.S. drone strike at Baghdad International Airport kills Iranian general Qasem Soleimani and Iraqi paramilitary leader Abu Mahdi al-Muhandis. Five days later, Iran carries out retaliatory missile strikes on U.S. bases in Iraq, while Ukraine International Airlines Flight 752 is shot down by the IRGC after being mistaken for an American cruise missile.
January 31 – The United Kingdom becomes the first member state to leave the European Union.
March – Beginning of the worldwide pandemic of SARS-CoV-2, the virus which causes COVID-19. Widespread economic disruption, including a stock market crash, occurred during the pandemic.
May 26 – Protests break out following the murder of George Floyd across hundreds of cities in the United States and even smaller ones outside the US. Derek Chauvin, the officer responsible for Floyd's murder, would ultimately be convicted on two counts of murder and one of manslaughter in the wake of the protests.
June 15 – Maria Ressa, CEO of Philippine news site Rappler, is found guilty of cyberlibel by a Manila court over a 2012 story linking a businessman to various crimes. She faces up to six years in prison.
June 30 – China passes the controversial Hong Kong national security law, allowing China to crack down on opposition to Beijing at home or abroad.
August 11 – Kamala Harris becomes the Democratic Party's nominee for vice-president of the United States, making her the first African-American, the first Asian-American and the third female vice presidential running mate on a major party ticket.
August 18 – A mutiny in a military base by soldiers of the Malian Armed Forces develops into a coup d'état. President Ibrahim Boubacar Keïta and Prime Minister Boubou Cissé, among other senior governmental and military officers, are forced to resign.
September 4 – Kosovo and Serbia announce that they will normalize economic relations.
November 3 – Joe Biden is elected as the 46th president of the United States, and Kamala Harris is elected as vice-president. Biden is the oldest person elected to a first term.
November 15:
President of Kyrgyzstan Sooronbay Jeenbekov resigns from office after weeks of massive protests in the wake of the October 2020 parliamentary election; opposition leader Sadyr Japarov assumes office as both the acting president and Prime Minister of Kyrgyzstan.
The Regional Comprehensive Economic Partnership (RCEP) is signed by 15 Asia-Pacific countries to form the world's largest free-trade bloc, covering a third of the world's population.
Sudanese Prime Minister Abdalla Hamdok and Abdelaziz al-Hilu, the leader of the Sudan People's Liberation Movement-North (SPLM–N), sign an agreement to transition the country into a secular state.
A United Nations Human Rights Council fact-finding mission formally accuses the Venezuelan government of crimes against humanity, including cases of killings, torture, violence against political opposition and disappearances since 2014. President Nicolás Maduro and other senior Venezuelan officials are among those implicated in the charges.
France, Germany, and the United Kingdom issue a joint note verbale to the United Nations rejecting China's claims to the South China Sea, and supporting the ruling in Philippines v. China that said the historic rights per the nine-dash line ran counter to the United Nations Convention on the Law of the Sea. However the statement says that on "territorial sovereignty" they "take no position."
Israel, Sudan, Morocco, the United Arab Emirates and Bahrain sign agreements to formally normalise diplomatic relations.
Azerbaijan launches a successful military campaign against Armenian forces to take back the disputed Nagorno-Karabakh region. Turkey sends Syrian mercenaries to assist in this endeavor, and Russia ends the conflict by deploying peacekeepers.
North Korea demolishes the Inter-Korean Liaison Office in Kaesong, established in 2018 to improve relations.
The Special Tribunal for Lebanon convicts in absentia Salim Ayyash, a senior member of Hezbollah, for the 2005 assassination of former Prime Minister Rafic Hariri.
Japanese Prime Minister Shinzo Abe, the longest-serving prime minister in the history of Japan, announces his pending resignation from office, citing ill health, he was replaced by Yoshihide Suga and Fumio Kishida.
The Emir of Kuwait Sheikh Sabah al-Sabah dies at the age of 91. Crown Prince Nawaf Al-Ahmad Al-Jaber Al-Sabah is named his successor.
The EU launches legal action against the UK, accusing it of breaking international law by overriding sections of the Brexit withdrawal agreement.
In the 2020 New Caledonian independence referendum, New Caledonia votes against independence from France.
Massive protests breakout in Kyrgyzstan following accusations that the parliamentary election was "unfair".
2021
January 6 – Pro-Trump rioters storm the US Capitol, disrupting the Congressional certification of United States President-elect Joe Biden. Trump is impeached a second time a week later for his role in the storming, making him the first US federal official to be impeached more than once and the first president to have his trial occur after his tenure expired.
January 15 – Wikipedia's 20th anniversary is noted in the media.
February 1 – A coup d'état in Myanmar removes Aung San Suu Kyi from power and restores military rule.
February 18 – NASA's Mars 2020 mission (containing the Perseverance rover and Ingenuity helicopter drone) lands on Mars at Jezero Crater, after seven months of travel.
April 30–June 13 – A crush during a pilgrimage on Lag BaOmer, renewed violence during the 2021 Israel-Palestine crisis and continuing problems with the COVID-19 pandemic in Israel precede the 2021 Israeli presidential election. Amidst the election, Naftali Bennett and Yair Lapid agree to a rotation government, first headed by Bennett, in order to oust Benjamin Netanyahu as Prime Minister as the month of crises is the culmination of scandals and corruption, including financial criminal charges, during Netanyahu's record long tenure.
June 24 – Filipino politician and the 15th President of the Philippines Benigno Aquino III dies at the age of 61.
July 7 – President of Haiti, Jovenel Moïse, is assassinated in a midnight attack by unknown mercenaries.
August 15 – The Taliban regain control of Kabul after US forces and the republican government flee Afghanistan, marking the end of the War in Afghanistan after nearly 20 years.
November 30 – Barbados becomes a republic by replacing Elizabeth II as Queen with Sandra Mason as president in the role of head of state.
December 16 – Typhoon Rai lashes into Visayas and Mindanao, leaving about 409 people dead.
December 25 – NASA, ESA, the Canadian Space Agency and the Space Telescope Science Institute launch the James Webb Space Telescope, the successor of the Hubble Space Telescope.
2022
February 4 – China and Russia issue a joint statement opposing further NATO expansion, expressing "serious concerns" about the AUKUS security pact, and pledging to cooperate with each other on a range of issues.
February 4–20 – The 2022 Winter Olympics are held in Beijing, China, making it the first city ever to host both the Summer Olympics and Winter Olympics.
February 24 – After a prolonged military buildup, Russia launches an invasion of Ukraine.
March 31 – The Philippine Air Force (PAF) introduces 1Lt. Jul Laiza Mae Camposano-Beran as the first female fighter pilot at the Basa Air Base, Floridablanca, Pampanga.
May 9 – Bongbong Marcos and Sara Duterte are elected the 17th President and 15th Vice President of the Philippines in a landslide victory.
May 24 – The Robb Elementary School shooting is perpetrated by 18-year-old Salvador Ramos, who fatally shot nineteen students and two teachers and wounded seventeen other people in Uvalde, Texas, United States. The shooting was the third-deadliest school shooting in the United States, after the Virginia Tech shooting in 2007 and the Sandy Hook Elementary School shooting in 2012, and the deadliest in Texas. In the shooting's wake, the most significant gun safety reform legislation in the U.S. in 30 years is enacted.
June 24 – The Supreme Court rules that the Constitution of the United States does not confer a right to abortion, thus overruling the 1973 case Roe v. Wade, and its related 1992 case Planned Parenthood v. Casey. Protests erupt across nearly every major city in the United States.
July 8 – Former Prime Minister of Japan Shinzo Abe is assassinated while giving a public speech in the city of Nara, Japan.
July 31 – Filipino politician and the 12th President of the Philippines Fidel V. Ramos dies at the age of 94.
September 8 – Elizabeth II, the longest reigning British monarch and longest reigning female monarch dies, and is succeeded by Charles III, her eldest child.
October 29 – At least 158 people are killed and another 197 injured in a crowd crush during Halloween festivities in Seoul, South Korea.
October 30 – Luiz Inácio Lula da Silva is elected as the 39th president of Brazil, after defeating incumbent Jair Bolsonaro, becoming the first Brazilian president to be elected for a third term.
November 24 – Long-time opposition leader Anwar Ibrahim is appointed by Yang di-Pertuan Agong Abdullah as Prime Minister of Malaysia.
December 7 – The Congress of Peru removes President Pedro Castillo from office and arrests him after he tries to dissolve congress in a coup attempt, Vice President Dina Boluarte succeeds him.
December 31 – Pope Emeritus Benedict XVI, who served from 2005 until his resignation in 2013, dies at the age of 95.
2023
January 7 – After four days and fifteen ballots, Representative Kevin McCarthy is elected the 55th Speaker of the United States House of Representatives.
January 8 – Supporters of former Brazilian president Jair Bolsonaro storm the Brazilian National Congress, the Supreme Federal Court and the Presidential Palace of Planalto.
January 17 – Nguyễn Xuân Phúc resigns as President of Vietnam amid several recent scandals in the government, he was later replaced by Võ Văn Thưởng who was elected on March 2.
January 18 – The Court of Tax Appeals acquits online news website Rappler as well as its founder, Maria Ressa, in a tax evasion case filed against them by the Philippine government in 2018.
January 25 – Chris Hipkins succeeds Jacinda Ardern as Prime Minister of New Zealand, six days after she announced her resignation.
January 27 – Widespread unrest erupts in Israel following an Israeli military raid in Jenin which left nine Palestinians dead. Incendiary air balloons are launched into Israeli populated areas following it. Israel responds with targeted airstrikes. Later the same day, seven Jewish civilians are shot dead in an East Jerusalem synagogue in a retaliatory attack.
January 30 – A Jamaat-ul-Ahrar suicide bombing inside a mosque in Peshawar, Khyber Pakhtunkhwa, Pakistan, kills at least 101 people and injures over 220 others.
February 2 – The European Central Bank and Bank of England each raise their interest rates by 0.5 percentage points to combat inflation, one day after the US Federal Reserve raises its federal funds rate by 0.25 percentage points.
February 3 – The US announces it is tracking alleged Chinese spy balloons over the Americas, with one drifting from Yukon to South Carolina before being shot down the next day, and a second hovering over Colombia and Brazil. This event is followed by subsequent detections and shootdowns of high-altitude objects elsewhere.
February 6 – Two earthquakes strike southern Turkey, the first 7.8 in Gaziantep Province and the other 7.5  in Kahramanmaraş Province, causing widespread damage and at least 5,100 deaths in Turkey and Syria, with more than 24,000 injured.
February 14 – Republican Nikki Haley announces her 2024 presidential campaign.
February 15 – Nicola Sturgeon announces her resignation as First Minister of Scotland.
February 21 – Vladimir Putin announces that Russia is suspending its participation in New START, a nuclear arms reduction treaty with the US.
February 24 – The Philippine Independent Church ordains Wylard Ledama to the diaconate as the first trans woman clergy in the country.
February 27 – The United Kingdom and the European Union reach a new agreement surrounding modifications to the Northern Ireland Protocol.
February 28 – A train crash in Thessaly, Greece, kills 57 people and injures dozens. The crash leads to nationwide protests and strikes against the condition of Greek railways and their mismanagement by the government.
March 4:
UN member states agree on a legal framework for the High Seas Treaty, which aims to protect 30% of the world's oceans by 2030.
Negros Oriental governor Roel Degamo and eight others are killed by unknown gunmen in Degamo's home in Pamplona, Negros Oriental.

Politics, wars and states

New countries and territorial changes
Some territories and states have gained independence during the 21st century. This is a list of sovereign states that have gained independence in the 21st century and have been recognized by the UN.
  East Timor (Timor-Leste) on 20 May 2002.
  Montenegro on 3 June 2006.
  Serbia on 3 June 2006.
  South Sudan on 9 July 2011.

These nations gained sovereignty through government reform.
 Union of the Comoros on 23 December 2001.

The Union of the Comoros replaced the Federal Islamic Republic of the Comoros
 Transitional Islamic State of Afghanistan on 13 July 2002.

The Transitional Islamic State of Afghanistan replaced the Islamic State of Afghanistan.
  State Union of Serbia and Montenegro on 4 February 2003.

The State Union of Serbia and Montenegro replaced the Federal Republic of Yugoslavia.
 Islamic Republic of Afghanistan on 7 December 2004.

The Islamic Republic of Afghanistan replaced the Transitional Islamic State of Afghanistan
  Federal Democratic Republic of Nepal on 28 May 2008.

The Federal Democratic Republic of Nepal replaced the Kingdom of Nepal.
  National Transitional Council of Libya on 20 October 2011.

The National Transitional Council of Libya replaced the Great Socialist People's Libyan Arab Jamahiriya.
  State of Libya on 8 August 2012.

The State of Libya replaced the National Transitional Council of Libya.
 Islamic Emirate of Afghanistan on 15 August 2021.

The Islamic Emirate of Afghanistan replaced the Islamic Republic of Afghanistan.

These territories have declared independence and secured relative autonomy but they have only been recognized by some UN member states:
  Kosovo on 17 February 2008. (partially recognized)
  South Ossetia on 26 August 2008. (partially recognized)
  Abkhazia on 26 August 2008. (partially recognized)

These territories have declared independence and secured relative autonomy but they have been recognized by no one:
  Islamic State of Iraq and the Levant in June 2014. Had taken over much of Iraq, Syria and Libya. It is considered a terrorist organization and no longer holds any significant territorial control.
  Republic of Catalonia on 27 October 2017. The Catalan Parliament proclaimed the Catalan Republic, but the Kingdom of Spain did not recognise this and for a time imposed direct rule. (See 2017 Catalan independence referendum and 2017–2018 Spanish constitutional crisis)
  Southern Transitional Council in March 2017. Claimed the majority of the southern part of Yemen and the restoration of South Yemen.

These territories were annexed from a sovereign country, the action has only been recognized by some UN member states:
  Crimea annexed from Ukraine into the Russian Federation on 18 March 2014.
 ,  Kherson Oblast, and  Zaporizhzhia Oblast annexed from Ukraine into the Russian Federation on 30 September 2022.

These territories were ceded to another country:
   India–Bangladesh enclaves, traded between the two countries in 2015.
  Armenian-occupied territories surrounding Nagorno-Karabakh and the Lachin corridor, surrendered by Armenia to Azerbaijan at the end of the Second Nagorno-Karabakh War.

Science and technology

Space exploration

 2001 – Dennis Tito becomes the first space tourist by paying $19 million to board the International Space Station.
 2003 – Space Shuttle Columbia disaster on 1 February.
 2003 – The Chinese space program launches its first crewed space flight, Shenzhou 5, on 15 October. This made China the third country in the world to have indigenous crewed space capability.
 2004 – Mars Exploration Rovers land on Mars; Opportunity discovers evidence that an area of Mars was once covered in water.
 2004 – SpaceShipOne makes the first privately funded human spaceflight, on 21 June.
 2005 – The Huygens probe lands on Titan, the largest of Saturn's moons, on 14 January.
 2006 – The New Horizons probe is launched to Pluto, on 19 January.
 2006 – Pluto is reclassified from a planet to a dwarf planet, leaving the solar system with eight planets.
 2007 – China launches its first lunar mission with the Chang'e 1, on 24 October.
 2008 – India launches its first lunar mission Chandrayaan-1 which included a remote sensing orbiter and impactor on 22 October 2008. It made India the third nation to place its flag on Moon.
 2008 – Chinese space program launches its third crewed space flight carrying its first three-person crew and conducts its first spacewalk that makes China the third nation after Russia and USA to do that, Shenzhou 7, on 25 September.
 2008 – Phoenix discovers water ice on Mars.
 2009 – Iran launches its first satellite, Omid, on 2 February.
 2011 – NASA retires the last Space Shuttle, Atlantis, marking an end to its three-decade shuttle program.
 2012 – SpaceX successfully delivers cargo to the International Space Station.
 2012 – NASA successfully lands the Curiosity rover on the surface of Mars, on 6 August.
 2014 – India's Mars Orbiter Mission, the nation's first attempt to send a spacecraft to Mars, successfully entered orbit on 24 September, making India the fourth nation in the world to reach that goal.
 2014 – The European Space Agency robotic spacecraft Philae landed successfully on the comet 67P, the first cometary landing ever.
 2015 – On 14 July, NASA's New Horizons spacecraft became the first to fly by Pluto, on a mission to photograph and collect data on its planetary system. No other spacecraft has yet performed such a mission so far from Earth.
 2015 – On 28 September, NASA announces that liquid water has been found on Mars.
 2015 - SpaceX launches and lands a Falcon 9 into orbital space on 21 December, becoming the first reusable rocket to do so.
 2016 - SpaceX lands the first orbital rocket, a CRS-8, on a drone platform at sea on 8 April.
 2016 – On 4 July, NASA's Juno space probe maneuvered into a polar orbit to study the planet Jupiter.
 2016 - On 26 July, Solar Impulse 2 becomes the first solar-powered aircraft to circumnavigate the world.
 2016 – On 24 August, an Earth-sized exoplanet is discovered around Proxima Centauri, 4.2 light years away, which is potentially habitable.
 2016 - On 8 September, NASA's ORIRIS-Rex space probe is launched as the first asteroid sample return mission to collect samples from Bennu.
 2019 – On 3 January, Chinese probe Chang'e 4 becomes the first human-made object to land on the far side of the Moon.
 2019 – NASA concludes the 15-year Opportunity rover mission after being unable to wake the rover from hibernation.
 2019 – Israel launched its first spacecraft, Beresheet, towards the Moon on 7 April; after two months of journey, the spacecraft failed to land and crashed on the surface of the Moon, making Israel the seventh country to orbit the Moon.
 2019 – The first image of the supermassive black hole inside galaxy Messier 87 was captured by the Event Horizon Telescope.
 2021 – NASA's Perseverance rover, carrying the Ingenuity helicopter, successfully lands on Mars.
 2021 – NASA's James Webb Space Telescope is successfully launched into orbit.
 2022 – The first image of the supermassive black hole inside Milky Way was captured by the Event Horizon Telescope.
 2022 – The first image from the James Webb Space Telescope is published.
 2022 – NASA successfully launches the Artemis 1 moon mission on the SLS spacecraft after multiple delays.

Physics
 2003 – WMAP observations of the cosmic microwave background.
 2010 – The Large Hadron Collider's first high energy collisions took place in March 2010.
 2012 – Physicists discover the Higgs boson based on collisions at the Large Hadron Collider, on 4 July. It is the latest particle to be discovered in the Standard Model.
 2016 – On 11 February, LIGO announces the discovery of bursts of gravitational waves generated by cosmic collisions of black holes on, and was previously predicted by Albert Einstein 100 years ago.

Mathematics
2002 – Grigori Perelman posted the first of a series of eprints to the arXiv, in which he proved the Poincaré conjecture, the first of the Millennium Prize Problems to be solved.
2013 – Yitang Zhang publishes a paper in the Annals of Mathematics that established the first finite bound on the least gap between consecutive primes that is attained infinitely often.

Biotechnology and medicine

 2003 – Completion of the Human Genome Project
 2005 – The first successful partial face transplant is performed in France.
 2006 – Australian of the Year Dr Ian Frazer develops a vaccine for cervical cancer.
 2007 – Visual prosthetic (bionic eye) Argus II.
 2008 – Japanese scientists create a form of artificial DNA.
 2008 – Laurent Lantieri performs the first full face transplant.

 2012 – The first successful complete face transplant is performed in Turkey.
 2012 – Doubts raised over Statin medication.
 2013 – First kidney grown in vitro in the U.S.
 2013 – First human liver grown from stem cells in Japan.

Telecommunications

The Digital Revolution continued into the early 21st century with mobile phone usage and Global Internet usage growing massively, becoming available to many more people, with more applications and faster speeds.

Social networking emerged in the mid-2000s as a popular social communication, largely replacing much of the function of email, message boards and instant messaging services. Twitter, Facebook, YouTube, Instagram, Snapchat and WeChat are all major examples of social media to gain widespread popularity. The use of webcams and front-facing cameras on PCs and related devices, and services such as Skype, Zoom, and FaceTime have made video calling and video conferencing widespread. Their use hugely increased during the COVID-19 pandemic.

Civil unrest

Disasters

Natural disasters

2000s
 2001 Gujarat earthquake – An earthquake in Gujarat, India on 26 January 2001, killed approximately 20,000 people.
 January 2001 El Salvador earthquake – A 7.9 earthquake in El Salvador shook the whole country on 13 January 2001, causing a major devastating landslide, hundreds dead, thousands injured and many homeless. A month later, on 13 February 2001, the country suffered a second earthquake – 6.7
 2003 European heat wave – Approximately up to 70,000 people were killed across Europe in a summer long heat wave.
 2003 Bam earthquake – An earthquake in Bam, Iran on 27 December 2003, killed more than 26,000.
 2004 Hurricane Jeanne – Over 3,000 people are killed by Hurricane Jeanne in Haiti in September 2004.
 2004 Indian Ocean earthquake and tsunami – On 26 December 2004, a massive undersea earthquake resulted in a massive tsunami striking southeast Asia killing approximately 230,000.
 2005 Hurricane Katrina – The hurricane killed 1,836 in southeast Louisiana and Mississippi (mostly in New Orleans) and South Florida. A significant portion of the city, most of which sits below sea level, was submerged. Damages reached US$81.5 billion, making Katrina the costliest tropical cyclone ever recorded in the U.S.
 2005 Kashmir earthquake – An earthquake in Kashmir on 8 October 2005, killed at least 74,500 in India and Pakistan.
 2008 Cyclone Nargis – lead to catastrophic storm surge, leading to a death toll in excess of 100,000 and making millions homeless.
 2008 Sichuan earthquake – An earthquake between 7.9 and 8.0-magnitude struck Sichuan, China, on 12 May 2008, killing 68,712, with 17,921 missing.
 2009 Black Saturday bushfires – The Black Saturday bushfires were a series of bushfires that ignited or were burning across the Australian state of Victoria, Australia on and around Saturday, 7 February 2009. The fires occurred during extreme bushfire-weather conditions and resulted in Australia's highest ever loss of life from a bushfire; 173 people died and 414 were injured.
 2009 L'Aquila earthquake – A 6.3 magnitude earthquake strikes near L'Aquila (Italy) on 6 April 2009, one of the worst in Italian history. 308 were pronounced dead and more than 65,000 were made homeless.
 2009 flu pandemic – A worldwide outbreak of Influenza A virus subtype H1N1 spread around the world forming a pandemic by June 2009.

2010s

 2010 Haiti earthquake – At least 230,000 are killed in Haiti after a massive earthquake on 12 January 2010. Three million people were made homeless.
 2010 Chile earthquake – A massive earthquake, magnitude 8.8, strikes the central Chilean coast on 27 February 2010.
 2010 Yushu earthquake – A large 6.9 magnitude earthquake struck the Yushu region of China in Qinghai near Tibet, on 14 April 2010, killing over 2,200 people.
 2010 eruption of Eyjafjallajökull – A massive ash cloud is formed by the eruption of the Icelandic volcano Eyjafjallajökull, on 14 April 2010, grounding flights across northwest Europe. Scientists began recording volcanic activity there in 2009 which increased through March 2010 culminating in the second phase eruption in April.
 2010 Pakistan floods – Began in July 2010 after record heavy monsoon rains. The Khyber Pakhtunkhwa province of Pakistan was worst affected. At least 1,600 people were killed, thousands were rendered homeless, and more than thirteen million people were affected. Estimates from rescue service officials suggest the death toll may reach 3,000 victims.
 2011 Queensland floods – Began in December 2010 primarily in Queensland. The flood causes thousands of people to evacuate. At least 200,000 people were affected by the flood. The flood continued throughout January 2011 in Queensland, and the estimated reduction in Australia's GDP is about A$30 billion.
 Cyclone Yasi – A category 5 (Australian Scale) cyclone hits North Queensland with winds as strong as 290 km/hr (197 miles/hr) and devastates the residents of North Queensland.
 February 2011 Christchurch earthquake – 185 people died in New Zealand after a 6.3-magnitude earthquake hit Christchurch on 22 February 2011, making it New Zealand's second-deadliest natural disaster after the 1931 Hawke's Bay earthquake.
 2011 Tōhoku earthquake and tsunami – On 11 March 2011, a catastrophic undersea earthquake of magnitude 9.0 occurred offshore of eastern Japan, the greatest in the country's history and created a massive tsunami which killed 15,894; it also triggered the Fukushima I nuclear accidents. The overall cost for the earthquake, tsunami and nuclear accidents reached up to US$235 billion, making it the costliest natural disaster on record.
 2011 Super Outbreak – Regarded as the deadliest tornado outbreak ever recorded and dubbed the 2011 Super Outbreak, a catastrophic tornado outbreak on 25–28 April affected the Southern United States and killed over 330 people, most of whom were in or from Alabama. Damages are expected to be near or over $10 billion.
 2011 Joplin tornado – On 22 May 2011, a devastating EF5 tornado struck Joplin, Missouri resulting in 159 casualties, making it the deadliest tornado to hit the United States since 1947.
 Tropical Storm Washi – Locally known as Sendong, it caused catastrophic flooding in the Philippine island of Mindanao on the night of 16 December 2011. The hardest hits were in Cagayan de Oro and Iligan City. Almost 1000 people perished, most of whom were sleeping, and President Benigno Aquino III declared a state of calamity four days later.
 Hurricane Sandy – 24–30 October 2012 – kills at least 185 people in the Caribbean, Bahamas, United States and Canada. Considerable storm surge damage causes major disruption to the eastern seaboard of the United States.
 2013 Bohol earthquake - An earthquake of magnitude 7.2 that killed 22 people and destroyed a total worth of ₱2.25 billion,
 Typhoon Haiyan 2013 – kills more than 6,000 people in central Philippines. Considered to be one of the strongest storms ever, it brought major damage and loss of life to the Philippines, especially the islands of Leyte and Samar. A worldwide humanitarian effort began in the aftermath of the typhoon.
 2014 Southeast Europe floods – kill at least 80 people in Bosnia and Herzegovina and Serbia. Floodwaters caused over 2,000 landslides across the Balkan region, spreading damage across many towns and villages.
 April 2015 Nepal earthquake – An earthquake of 7.8 magnitude kills almost 9,000 people, injures another 22,000 and leaves nearly 3 million people homeless in Central Nepal. The earthquake was so strong it was felt in India, Pakistan and Bangladesh.
 2016 Taiwan earthquake – An earthquake of 6.4 magnitude kills 117 people, injures 550, and 4 people were left missing. The earthquake resulted in 3 executives of the Weiguan developer being arrested under charges of professional negligence resulting in death.
 August 2016 Central Italy earthquake – A 6.2 magnitude earthquake killed 299 people and severely damaged Amatrice, Accumoli and Arquata del Tronto.

2020s
 Unprecedented flooding displaces millions and threatens famine in Sudan and South Sudan in 2020–2021.
 On 12 January 2020, the Taal Volcano erupted for the first time in 43 years. 
 The 2020 Atlantic hurricane season, the most active regional season on record with 30 total named storms, results in over 400 fatalities across parts of the United States, Central America and the Caribbean.
 At least 20 people are killed in 2021 Henan floods in China after heavy rainfall (at least 20c per hour) exacerbated by the approach of Typhoon In-fa breaks existing records.
 The 2021 European floods kill over 188 people and devastate Belgium, Germany, Austria, the Netherlands, Croatia, Switzerland, Italy and Luxemburg. Floods in Germany prove to be the deadliest since the North Sea Flood of 1962.
 On 27 July 2022, a magnitude-7.0 earthquake hit Luzon, causing 11 deaths and ₱1.88 billion of property damage.
 In September 2022, Hurricane Ian hit the west coast of Florida as a Category 4 Atlantic hurricane, becoming the deadliest hurricane to hit Florida since the 1935 Labor Day hurricane.

Man-made disasters

 On 27 July 2002, a Sukhoi Su-27 fighter crashes at an air show in Ukraine, killing 77 and injuring more than 100, making it the worst air show disaster in history.
 On 1 February 2003, at the conclusion of the STS-107 mission, the Space Shuttle Columbia disintegrates during reentry over Texas, killing all seven astronauts on board.
 The Black Saturday bushfires – the deadliest bushfires in Australian history took place across the Australian state of Victoria on 7 February 2009, during extreme bushfire-weather conditions, resulting in 173 people killed, more than 500 injured, and around 7,500 homeless. The fires came after Melbourne recorded the highest-ever temperature (46.4 °C, 115 °F) of any capital city in Australia. The majority of the fires were ignited by either fallen or clashing power lines or deliberately lit.
 On 10 April 2010, Polish President Lech Kaczyński, his wife and 94 other people, including dozens of government officials, are killed in a plane crash.
 On 20 April 2010, an explosion on the Deepwater Horizon offshore drilling rig, operating in the Gulf of Mexico off the coast of Louisiana, left eleven crewmen dead and resulted in a fire that sank the rig and caused a massive-scale oil spill that may become one of the worst environmental disasters in United States history. On 18 June 2010, oceanographer John Kessler said that the crude gushing from the well contains 40 percent methane, compared to about 5 percent found in typical oil deposits. Methane is a natural gas that could potentially suffocate marine life and create "dead zones" where oxygen is so depleted that nothing lives. "This is the most vigorous methane eruption in modern human history," Kessler said.

Pandemics and epidemics

 2002–2004 – Severe acute respiratory syndrome (SARS) spreads to many countries in the 2002–2004 SARS outbreak.
 2009 – Influenza A virus subtype H1N1 spreads around the world, becoming a global pandemic.
 2014 – Ebola virus spreads in west Africa, prompting the then-largest epidemic, with more than 20,000 cases. The first cases outside Africa are reported.
 2019–present – A worldwide pandemic caused by the SARS-CoV-2 virus takes place. It leads to widespread social and economic disruption and, by early 2023, more than 6.8 million deaths.

Economics and industry
 The late-2000s financial crisis caused the Great Recession, which lasted into the early 2010s.
 In the early 2010s the European sovereign-debt crisis caused major effects on European politics and contributing to power shifts and the introduction of austerity policies in different countries.
 Developing countries make up for 97% of the world's growth, and industrialization leads to the rapid rise of BRIC economies and the weakening of American hegemony in the global economy.
 The recession caused by the COVID-19 pandemic forced many governments and economic sectors to heavily invest and restructure, especially through widespread introduction of remote work.
 Economic restructuring was pursued in many economies due to global climate change.

Sports
Association football is the most popular sport worldwide with the FIFA World Cup being the most viewed football event. Other sports such as rugby, cricket, baseball, basketball, ice hockey, tennis, and golf are popular globally. In cricket, the emergence of the Twenty20 format and the creation of the Indian Premier League led to changes in the nature of the sport. American swimmer Michael Phelps won an Olympic record setting 8 Gold medals at the 2008 Summer Olympics.

Association football 
 The 2002 FIFA World Cup – host South Korea and Japan – was won by Brazil
 The 2006 FIFA World Cup – host Germany – was won by Italy
 The 2010 FIFA World Cup – host South Africa – was won by Spain
 The 2014 FIFA World Cup – host Brazil – was won by Germany
 The 2018 FIFA World Cup – host Russia – was won by France
 The 2022 FIFA World Cup – host Qatar – was won by Argentina

Cricket 
 The 2003 Cricket World Cup – host South Africa, Zimbabwe and Kenya – was won by Australia
 The 2007 Cricket World Cup – host West Indies – was won by Australia
 The 2011 Cricket World Cup – host India, Sri Lanka and Bangladesh – was won by India
 The 2015 Cricket World Cup – host Australia and New Zealand – was won by Australia
 The 2019 Cricket World Cup – host England and Wales – was won by England

Gridiron football 

In the National Football League, the New England Patriots were the dominant franchise of the first two decades of the 21st century, winning six Super Bowls between their first, in 2001, and their most recent, in 2018 and appearing in an additional three others. Head Coach Bill Belichick and quarterback Tom Brady led the team during the stretch, with Brady also leading the Tampa Bay Buccaneers to an additional Super Bowl following the 2020 season. Other teams with multiple Super Bowl appearances over that time period include the Philadelphia Eagles, New York Giants, Kansas City Chiefs, Seattle Seahawks, and Carolina Panthers. Besides Brady, who also won three Associated Press NFL Most Valuable Player Award (MVP), other highly recognized players include quarterback Peyton Manning, who won five MVP awards, the most in history, and quarterback Aaron Rodgers who won three MVPs, who in 2011 set the NFL record for season passer rating. Successful offensive players at other positions include wide receiver Randy Moss, who set the record for most receiving touchdowns in a season with 23 in 2007, wide receiver Michael Thomas, who set the NFL record for most receptions in a season with 149 in 2019, tight end Rob Gronkowski, who became the first tight end to lead the league in receiving touchdowns in 2011, and running back Adrian Peterson, who set the all-time NFL record for rushing yards in a game with 296 in 2007, his rookie year. Key defensive players of the century include safety Ed Reed, who led the league in interceptions three times, linebacker Ray Lewis, who set the career tackles record when he retired in 2012, and linebacker J. J. Watt, who is the only player to record more than 20 quarterback sacks in two different seasons.
In American college football, the sport saw the creation of the College Football Playoff, the first playoff for NCAA Division I Football Bowl Subdivision, the highest level of college football in the U.S. The series was dominated by two teams, the Clemson Tigers and Alabama Crimson Tide, at least one of which has played in every Playoff since its inception in 2014 and between them have won all but one of said championships. Prior to 2014, the method of determining the champion was done via the Bowl Championship Series (BCS), a single championship game that attempted to match the top two teams in the country using a series of polls and computer rankings to choose the top two teams. In the BCS era, the top teams were Alabama, which won three BCS Championships, and Florida State, LSU, and Oklahoma, which won two BCS Championships each. Nick Saban, who led both LSU and Alabama to one and seven national championships respectively, was the most dominant coach of his era, while quarterbacks dominated the Heisman Trophy, winning 16 of 20 during the first two decades of the 21st century. Several controversies over the payment of athletes dominated the sport, with Heisman Trophy winner Reggie Bush being forced to return his award over receiving improper benefits while maintaining amateur status, while officials and media continued to debate the possibility of paying athletes at all levels of college athletics.
In Canadian football, the league opened the 21st century facing an uncertain financial future, suffering from the failures of the experiment of trying to field Canadian football teams in the United States and having to contract a large number of teams at the end of the 20th century. The league fluctuated between eight and nine teams as two different Ottawa-based franchises failed during the first decade of the 21st century. The league found stability during the 2010s, and showed surprising parity between the teams, with all nine teams appearing in at least one Grey Cup during the 2000s and 2010s, and with only the Montreal Alouettes winning back-to-back titles during those two decades, in 2009 and 2010. Quarterback Anthony Calvillo of the Alouettes was the face of the league during his career, winning three Most Outstanding Player Awards and setting several passing records in the process.

Golf 

 The 2002 Ryder Cup was won by Europe 15 and a half to USA's 12 and a half.
 The 2004 Ryder Cup was won by Europe 18 and a half to USA's 9 and a half.
 The 2006 Ryder Cup was won by Europe again 18 and a half to USA's 9 and a half.
 The 2008 Ryder Cup was won by USA 16 and a half to Europe's 11 and a half.
 The 2010 Ryder Cup was won by Europe 14 and a half to USA's 13 and a half.
 The 2012 Ryder Cup was won by Europe 14 and a half to USA's 13 and a half.
 The 2014 Ryder Cup was won by Europe 16 and a half to USA's 11 and a half.
 The 2016 Ryder Cup was won by USA 17 to Europe's 11.
 The 2018 Ryder Cup was won by Europe 17 and a half to USA's 10 and a half.

Motorsport 

 Dale Earnhardt died after a last-lap crash during the Daytona 500 in February 2001. 
 Michael Schumacher broke many records in the first few years of the century, including the record for most races won (91), most World Championships (7), and most pole positions (68) by the time he retired in 2006. In 2010, he announced his comeback to Formula One after three years out of the sport, retiring again in 2012.
 Sebastian Vettel broke numerous records on his way to becoming Formula One's youngest ever world champion, in 2010 at age 23, and then the youngest ever double world champion, in 2011 at age 24.
 Sébastien Loeb became the most successful rally driver ever, winning the World Rally Championship a record 9 consecutive times between 2004 and 2012. He also set new records for the most wins, podium finishes and points scored.
 Casey Stoner won his second MotoGP world title (2007 and 2011), and announced his retirement from the sport at just 27 years of age, citing disagreement with the direction of the sport and a desire to spend more time with his family. His retirement became effective at the end of the 2012 MotoGP season. Stoner has won every MotoGP-branded race at least once.
 Craig Lowndes became the first driver to reach 100 race wins in the V8 Supercars Championship.
 Lewis Hamilton broke the record for most career pole positions in Formula One in 2019, and the record for most career wins in 2020.

Rugby Union 
 2003 Rugby World Cup – host Australia – was won by England
 2007 Rugby World Cup – host France – was won by South Africa
 2011 Rugby World Cup – host New Zealand – was won by New Zealand
 2015 Rugby World Cup – host England – was won by New Zealand
 2019 Rugby World Cup – host Japan – was won by South Africa

Tennis (Men) 
 Roger Federer won 20 Grand Slam titles (6 Australian Opens, 1 French Open, 8 Wimbledons, and 5 US Opens) to surpass Pete Sampras' record of 14.
 Roger Federer, Rafael Nadal and Novak Djokovic each completed a Career Grand Slam, winning the singles championships in the Australian Open, French Open, Wimbledon and US Open; Nadal also won the Olympic Singles gold medal in the 2008 Beijing Summer Olympics to complete a Golden Career Slam.
 At the 2010 Wimbledon Championships, John Isner and Nicolas Mahut completed the longest tennis match ever. Isner won 6–4, 3–6, 6–7(7), 7–6(3), 70–68.
 In 2019, Rafael Nadal became the first male player to win a single Grand Slam tournament (French Open) 12 times.

Tennis (Women) 
 Serena Williams won 23 Grand Slam titles (7 Australian Opens, 3 French Opens, 7 Wimbledons, and 6 US Opens) in the 21st century, to add to her 1999 US Open title. Including a 2017 Australian Open win whilst 8 weeks pregnant 
 Maria Sharapova became the first female Russian player to reach No.1 on 22 August 2005. She also retired in 2020.
 China's Li Na won the 2011 French Open, becoming the first player, male or female, from that country to win a Grand Slam.
 Belarusian Victoria Azarenka won the 2012 Australian Open, becoming the first player, male or female, from that country to win a Grand Slam, and also hold the No.1 ranking (taking over from Caroline Wozniacki).

Arts and entertainment

Arts 

 Art:21 - Art in the 21st Century (2001–2018), a PBS series

Music

At the beginning of the century, the compact disc (CD) was the standard form of music media, but alternative forms of music media started to take it place such as music downloading and online streaming. A resurgence in sales of vinyl records in the 2010s was driven by record collectors and audiophiles who prefer the sound of analog vinyl records to digital recordings. In 2020, for the first time since the 1980s, vinyl surpassed CDs as the primary form of physical media for consumers of music, though both were still surpassed by online streaming, which by the 2020s became the predominant way that people consumed music. As of 2020, the most active music streaming services were YouTube (1 billion monthly music users, 20 million premium subscribers), Tencent Music (657 million monthly users, 42.7 million premium subscribers), 130 million premium subscribers), SoundCloud (175 million monthly users), Gaana (152 million monthly users), JioSaavn (104 million monthly users), Spotify (286 million monthly users), Pandora (60.9 million monthly users), and Apple Music (60 million subscribers).

Television
As with music, the story of the first two decades of the 21st century was the growth of streaming television services in competition with older forms of television, such as Terrestrial television, cable television, and satellite television. The first major company to dominate the streaming service market was Netflix, which began as a DVD-delivery service in the late 1990s, transitioned into an online media streaming platform initially focused on delivering content produced by studios, then began to produce its own content, beginning with the popular and critically acclaimed series House of Cards in 2013. Netflix's success encouraged the creation of numerous other streaming services, such as Hulu, YouTube Premium, Amazon Prime Video, and Disney+, which within a year of its launch overtook Netflix as the most downloaded television streaming application.

Issues and concerns
 Global warming. Climate scientists have reached a consensus that the earth is undergoing significant anthropogenic (human-induced) global warming. The resulting economic and ecological costs are hard to predict. Some scientists argue that human-induced global warming risks considerable losses in biodiversity and ecosystem services unless considerable sociopolitical changes are introduced, particularly in patterns of mass consumption and transportation.

 Globalization. Advances in telecommunications and transportation, the expansion of capitalism and democracy since the late 1980s, and free trade agreements have resulted in unprecedented global economic and cultural integration. Most economists believe free trade leads to economic growth and benefits most people, including small businesses. In recent years, however, there has been a backlash against globalization and a return to protectionist attitudes among some leaders and nations, most notably United States President Donald Trump and the United Kingdom's decision to leave the European Union.

 Population. The world's population demographics will shift considerably in this century, with the population of Europe and East Asia to decline considerably and the population of Africa and to a lesser extent South Asia to grow considerably. The United Nations estimates that world population will reach 9.8 billion by 2050. Most of this growth will take place in the world's poorer countries, which may slow down the global reduction of poverty and combined with the effects of global warming may lead to large migrations. 
 Overconsumption and overpopulation. The United Nations estimates that world population will reach 9.2 billion by mid-century. Such growth raises questions of ecological sustainability and creates many economic and political disruptions. In response, many countries have adopted policies which either force or encourage their citizens to have fewer children, and others have limited immigration. Considerable debate exists over what the ultimate carrying capacity of the planet may be; whether or not population growth containment policies are necessary; to what degree growth can safely occur thanks to increased economic and ecological efficiency; and how distribution mechanisms should accommodate demographic shifts. Many developed countries (most notably Japan) will experience population decline, and the population debate is strongly tied with discussions about the distribution of wealth.
 Poverty. Poverty remains the root cause of many of the world's other ills, including famine, disease, and insufficient education. Poverty contains many self-reinforcing elements (for instance, poverty can make education an unaffordable luxury, which tends to result in continuing poverty) that various aid groups hope to rectify in this century. Immense progress has been made in reducing poverty, especially in China and India but increasingly in Africa as well. Microcredit lending has also started to gain a profile as a useful anti-poverty tool.
 Disease. AIDS, tuberculosis and malaria each kill over a million people annually. HIV remains without a cure or vaccine, and while new cases are declining it remains a major problem, especially for women. Antibiotic resistance is a growing concern for organisms such as tuberculosis. Other diseases, such as SARS, COVID-19, ebola, the Zika virus and flu variations, are also causes for concern. The World Health Organization has warned of a possible coming flu pandemic resulting from bird flu mutations. In 2009, there was an outbreak of swine flu whose country of origin is still unknown.

 War and terrorism. Although war and terror have declined so far in the early 21st century, active conflicts continue around the world, such as the Syrian Civil War, the Yemeni Civil War and the War in Afghanistan. The 9/11 terrorist attacks triggered invasions of Afghanistan and partially and controversially Iraq. The War on Terror has seen controversies over civil liberties, accusations of torture, continued terrorist attacks and ongoing instability, violence, and military occupation. Violence continues in the Arab–Israeli conflict. Considerable concern remains about nuclear proliferation, especially in Iran and North Korea, and the availability of weapons of mass destruction to rogue groups.
War on drugs. Increasingly, the legal, social and military battle led by governments against drug cartels around the world show little results in ending drug trading and consumption, and a constant increase in the lives taken from this struggle. Notably, after 2006 in the Mexican Drug War, more than 100,000 human lives have been lost to this conflict. Some jurisdictions have enacted some degree of legalization or decriminalization of some kinds of drugs, notably including several U.S. states legalizing marijuana either for recreational or medical use.
 Intellectual property. The increasing popularity of digital formats for entertainment media such as movies and music, and the ease of copying and distributing it via the Internet and peer-to-peer networks, has raised concerns in the media industry about copyright infringement. Much debate is proceeding about the proper bounds between protection of copyright, trademark and patent rights versus fair use and the public domain, where some argue that such laws have shifted greatly towards intellectual property owners and away from the interests of the general public in recent years, while others say that such legal change is needed to deal with a perceived threat of new technologies against the rights of authors and artists (or, as others put it, against the outmoded business models of the current entertainment industry). Domain name "cybersquatting" and access to patented drugs and generics to combat epidemics in third-world countries are other IP concerns.
 Technology developments continue to change society. Communications and control technology continues to augment the intelligence of individual humans, collections of humans, and machines. Some, notably Ray Kurzweil, have predicted that by the middle of the century there will be a technological singularity if artificial intelligence that outsmarts humans is created. In addition, some economists have expressed concerns over technological unemployment due to automation.

 Civil rights, including women's rights, LGBT rights, racial equality and the rights of disabled and neurodiverse people are still a work in progress. Women are not able to realize or are outright denied their rights in many countries, including India, China and Saudi Arabia, and sexual violence against women is still an enormous problem everywhere in the world. Sex-selective abortion has reduced the number of women born worldwide since 1990, mostly because of son preference in China, India, Pakistan, Vietnam, South Korea and some other smaller countries. In many countries attitudes towards homosexuality have become more tolerant. Same-sex marriage was legalized in several jurisdictions during the first two decades of the century, but outlawed by constitutional amendment in other places. Meanwhile, some countries such as Uganda and Russia moved to toughen their laws against any sort of homosexual behavior or expression. Political battles over pro- or anti-gay legislation provoked much activism in the streets and on the Internet. Hate groups remain a serious problem, and ethnic minorities have a lower status in many countries, including the United States. Neurological conditions such as autism are slowly becoming more understood and recognized.

Astronomical events
 2004: Transit of Venus.
 23 December 2007: grand conjunction, a galactic conjunction which happens every 26,000 years.
 2009: Triple conjunction Jupiter–Neptune.
 Solar eclipse of July 22, 2009, total of 6 min 38.8 s, saros 136.
 Solar eclipse of January 15, 2010, annular of 11 min 08 s, saros 141. The longest of the century, and also of the entire millennium.
 2012: Transit of Venus.
 11 November 2019: Transit of Mercury.
 Solar eclipse of June 21, 2020, annular of 38 s, saros 137

See also

 20th century
 Timelines of modern history
 Contemporary art
 International relations since 1989

Notes

References

Further reading
 Adebajo, Adekeye, ed. Curse of Berlin: Africa After the Cold War (Oxford UP, 2014).
 Allitt, Patrick N. America after the Cold War: The First 30 Years (2020).
 Andersson, Jenny. The future of the world: Futurology, futurists, and the struggle for the post cold war imagination (Oxford UP, 2018).
 Ahram, Ariel I. War and Conflict in the Middle East and North Africa (John Wiley & Sons, 2020).
 Asare, Prince, and Richard Barfi. "The Impact of Covid-19 Pandemic on the Global Economy: Emphasis on Poverty Alleviation and Economic Growth." Economics 8.1 (2021): 32-43 online.
 Aziz, Nusrate, and M. Niaz Asadullah. "Military spending, armed conflict and economic growth in developing countries in the post–Cold War era." Journal of Economic Studies 44.1 (2017): 47–68.
 Brands, Hal. Making the unipolar moment: U.S. foreign policy and the rise of the post-Cold War order (2016).
 Brügger, Niels, ed, Web25: Histories from the first 25 years of the world wide web (Peter Lang, 2017).
 Cameron, Fraser. US foreign policy after the cold war: global hegemon or reluctant sheriff? (Psychology Press, 2005).
 Cassani, Andrea, and Luca Tomini. Autocratization in post-cold war political regimes (Springer, 2018).
 Clapton, William ed. Risk and Hierarchy in International Society: Liberal Interventionism in the Post-Cold War Era (Palgrave Macmillan UK. 2014)
 Dai, Jinhua, and Lisa Rofel, eds. After the Post–Cold War: The Future of Chinese History (Duke UP, 2018).
 Duong, Thanh. Hegemonic globalisation: U.S. centrality and global strategy in the emerging world order (Routledge, 2017).
 The Economist. The World in 2020 (2019)
 The Economist. The Pocket World in 2021 (2020) excerpt
 Gertler, Mark, and Simon Gilchrist. "What happened: Financial factors in the great recession." Journal of Economic Perspectives 32.3 (2018): 3-30. online
 Harrison, Ewam. The Post-Cold War International System: Strategies, Institutions and Reflexivity (2004).
 Henriksen, Thomas H. Cycles in US Foreign Policy Since the Cold War (Palgrave Macmillan, 2017) excerpt.
 Howe, Joshua P. Behind the curve: science and the politics of global warming (U of Washington Press, 2014).
 Jackson, Robert J. and Philip Towle. Temptations of Power: The United States in Global Politics after 9/11 (2007)
 Lamy, Steven L., et al. Introduction to global politics (4th ed. Oxford UP, 2017)
 Mandelbaum, Michael The Rise and Fall of Peace on Earth (Oxford UP, 2019) why so much peace 1989–2015. excerpt
 Maull, Hanns W., ed. The rise and decline of the post-Cold War international order (Oxford UP, 2018).
 Pekkanen, Saadia M., John Ravenhill, and Rosemary Foot, eds. Oxford handbook of the international relations of Asia (Oxford UP, 2014), comprehensive coverage.
 Ravenhill, John, ed. Global political economy (5th ed. Oxford UP, 2017) excerpt
 Reid-Henry, Simon. Empire of Democracy: The Remaking of the West Since the Cold War (2019) excerpt
 
 Rubin, Robert, and Jacob Weisberg. In an uncertain world: tough choices from Wall Street to Washington (2015).
 Rudolph, Peter. "The Sino-American World Conflict" (German Institute for International and Security Affairs. SWP Research Paper #3, February 2020). doi: 10.18449/2020RP03 online
 Schenk, Catherine R. International economic relations since 1945 (2nd ed. 2021).
 Smith, Rhona K.M. et al. International Human Rights (4th ed. 2018)
 Smith, Rhona KM. Texts and materials on international human rights (4th ed. Routledge, 2020).
 Strong, Jason. The 2010s: Looking Back At A Dramatic Decade (2019) online
 Taylor-Gooby, Peter, Benjamin Leruth, and Heejung Chung, eds. After austerity: Welfare state transformation in Europe after the great recession (Oxford UP, 2017).
 
 Tooze, Adam. Shutdown: How Covid Shook the World's Economy (2021).
 United Nations. World Economic Situation and Prospects 2020 (2020) online annual reports
 United Nations. World Economic and Social Survey 2010 - Retooling Global Development (2010) online

External links

 Reuters – The State of the World The story of the 21st century
 Long Bets Foundation to promote long-term thinking
Century Seasons
 Long Now Long-term cultural institution
 Scientific American Magazine (September 2005 Issue) The Climax of Humanity
 MapReport 21st Century Event World Map

 
3rd millennium
Centuries
Contemporary history